The Territorial Prelature of Chota is a Roman Catholic territorial prelature, an administrative division not within a diocese, located in the city of Chota in the Ecclesiastical province of Piura in Peru.

History
7 April 1963: Established as Territorial Prelature of Chota

Ordinaries
Prelates of Chota (Roman rite)
 Bishop Florentino Armas Lerena, O.A.R. (April 7, 1963 – August 17, 1976)
 Bishop José Arana Berruete, O.A.R. (January 24, 1979 – October 27, 1992)
 Bishop Emiliano Antonio Cisneros Martínez, O.A.R. (December 7, 1993 – March 27, 2002), appointed Bishop of Chachapoyas
 Bishop José Carmelo Martínez Lázaro, O.A.R. (March 27, 2002 – October 12, 2004), appointed Bishop of Cajamarca
 Bishop Fortunato Urcey, O.A.R. (October 15, 2005 – July 2, 2022)
 Bishop Víctor Emiliano Villegas Suclupe, O.A.R. (July 2, 2022 – present)

References
 GCatholic.org
 Catholic Hierarchy

Roman Catholic dioceses in Peru
Roman Catholic Ecclesiastical Province of Piura
Christian organizations established in 1963
Roman Catholic dioceses and prelatures established in the 20th century
Territorial prelatures
1963 establishments in Peru